Outpost Gamma is a 1981 board game published by Heritage Models. It's intended for two players and takes about 120 minutes to play. The game is for ages 12 and over.

Gameplay
Outpost Gamma is a game of a conflict involving colonists and explorers armed with advanced weaponry facing an overwhelming force of natives of the harsh planet Irda.

Reception
Bruce F. Webster reviewed Outpost Gamma in The Space Gamer No. 44. Webster commented that "I recommend Outpost Gamma without reservations.  Like Ogre and GEV, you will get far more than your money's worth."

Steve List reviewed Outpost Gamma in Ares Magazine #12 and commented that "its system is not one which admits (or encourages) developing home-brew scenarios as does Star Soldier. Outpost Gamma is not worth a visit."

In a retrospective review of Outpost Gamma in Black Gate, Sean McLachlan said "While the game balance was somewhat poor, we enjoyed playing. If we play this one again, though, I'll have to come up with a more balanced scenario."

Reviews
Asimov's Science Fiction v7 n3 (1983 03)

References

Board games introduced in 1981
Heritage Models games